The House That Ananda Built is a 1968 Indian short documentary film directed by Fali Bilimoria. It was nominated for an Academy Award for Best Documentary Short.

References

External links

Watch The House That Ananda Built on YouTube, posted by Films Division of India

1968 films
1968 documentary films
1968 short films
1960s short documentary films
Indian short documentary films
1960s English-language films